Chester House is a Grade II listed house on the west side of Wimbledon Common, Wimbledon, London, built in about 1700 or earlier.

The radical politician and reformer John Horne Tooke lived there from 1792 until his death in 1812.

References

External links
 

Grade II listed buildings in the London Borough of Merton
Houses completed in 1700
Houses in the London Borough of Merton
1700 establishments in England
Grade II listed houses in London
Country houses in London